This is the list of presidents of Liguria since 1970.

Presidents elected by the Regional Council (1970–1995)

Directly-elected presidents (since 1995)

Presidents of Liguria
Politics of Liguria
Liguria